Social dynamics (or sociodynamics) is the study of the behavior of groups that results from the interactions of individual group members as well to the study of the relationship between individual interactions and group level behaviors.

Overview 
The field of social dynamics brings together ideas from economics, sociology, social psychology, and other disciplines, and is a sub-field of complex adaptive systems or complexity science. The fundamental assumption of the field is that individuals are influenced by one another's behavior.  The field is closely related to system dynamics.  Like system dynamics, social dynamics is concerned with changes over time and emphasizes the role of feedbacks.  However, in social dynamics individual choices and interactions are typically viewed as the source of aggregate level behavior, while system dynamics posits that the structure of feedbacks and accumulations are responsible for system level dynamics.  Research in the field typically takes a behavioral approach, assuming that individuals are boundedly rational and act on local information.  Mathematical and computational modeling are important tools for studying social dynamics. This field grew out of work done in the 1940s by game theorists such as Duncan & Luce, and even earlier works by mathematician Armand Borel. Because social dynamics focuses on individual level behavior, and recognizes the importance of heterogeneity across individuals, strict analytic results are often impossible.  Instead, approximation techniques, such as mean-field approximations from statistical physics, or computer simulations are used to understand the behaviors of the system.  In contrast to more traditional approaches in economics, scholars of social dynamics are often interested in non-equilibrium, or dynamic, behavior.   That is, behavior that changes over time.

Topics 
 Social networks
 Diffusion of technologies and information
 Cooperation
 Social norms

See also 

 Complex adaptive system
 Complexity science
 Collective intelligence
 Dynamical systems
 Jay Wright Forrester
 Group dynamics
 Operations research
 Population dynamics
 System dynamics
 Social psychology
 Societal collapse
 Sociobiology
 Sociocultural evolution

Notes

References 
 Weidlich, W. (1997) "Sociodynamics applied to the evolution of urban and regional structures". Discrete Dynamics in Nature and Society, Vol. 1, pp. 85–98.
Available online: http://www.hindawi.com/GetArticle.aspx?doi=10.1155/S1026022697000101.

Further reading

External links 

 Introduction to Social Macrodynamics
  Club of Rome report, quote: "We must also keep in mind the presence of social delays--the delays necessary to allow society to absorb or to prepare for a change. Most delays, physical or social reduce the stability of the world system and increase the likelihood of the overshoot mode"
 Northwestern Institute on Complex Systems—Institute with research focusing on complexity and social dynamics.
 Center for the Study of Complex Systems, University of Michigan—Center with research focusing on complexity and social dynamics.
  social-dynamics.org—Blog on Social Dynamics from Kellogg School of Management Social Dynamics Scholar
 https://archive.today/20020305021324/http://139.142.203.66/pub/www/Journal/vol3/iss2/art4/
 http://arquivo.pt/wayback/20090628232019/http://www-rcf.usc.edu/~read/connectionism_preface2.html
 "Historical Dynamics in a Time of Crisis: Late Byzantium, 1204–1453" (discussion of social dynamics from the point of view of historical studies)
 

 
Systems theory
Social systems